The year 2014 was the second year in the history of the Absolute Championship Berkut, a mixed martial arts promotion based in Russia. 2014 started with Absolute Championship Berkut 1. It started broadcasting through a television agreement with  Match TV.

List of events

Mixed martial arts

ACB 1: Grand Prix Berkut 2014

Absolute Championship Berkut 1: Grand Prix Berkut 2014 was a mixed martial arts event held by Absolute Championship Berkut on March 2, 2014 at the Fight club Berkut in Grozny, Russia.

Results

ACB 2: Grand Prix Berkut 2014

Absolute Championship Berkut 2: Grand Prix Berkut 2014 was a mixed martial arts event held by Absolute Championship Berkut on March 9, 2014 at the Fight club Berkut in Grozny, Russia.

Results

ACB 3: Grand Prix Berkut 2014

Absolute Championship Berkut 3: Grand Prix Berkut 2014 was a mixed martial arts event held by Absolute Championship Berkut on March 16, 2014 at the Fight club Berkut in Grozny, Russia.

ACB 4: Grand Prix Berkut 2014

Absolute Championship Berkut 4: Grand Prix Berkut 2014 was a mixed martial arts event held by Absolute Championship Berkut on March 30, 2014 at the Fight club Berkut in Grozny, Russia.

Results

ACB 5: Grand Prix Berkut 2014

Absolute Championship Berkut 5: Grand Prix Berkut 2014 was a mixed martial arts event held by Absolute Championship Berkut on April 6, 2014 at the Fight club Berkut in Grozny, Russia.

Results

ACB 6: Grand Prix Berkut 2014

Absolute Championship Berkut 6: Grand Prix Berkut 2014 was a mixed martial arts event held by Absolute Championship Berkut on April 20, 2014 at the Fight club Berkut in Grozny, Russia.

Results

ACB 7: Grand Prix Berkut 2014

Absolute Championship Berkut 7: Grand Prix Berkut 2014 was a mixed martial arts event held by Absolute Championship Berkut on May 18, 2014, at the Fight club Berkut in Grozny, Russia.

Results

ACB 8: Grand Prix Berkut 2014

Absolute Championship Berkut 8: Grand Prix Berkut 2014 was a mixed martial arts event held by Absolute Championship Berkut on May 25, 2014, at the Fight club Berkut in Grozny, Russia.

Results

ACB 9: Grand Prix Berkut 2014

Absolute Championship Berkut 9: Grand Prix Berkut 2014 was a mixed martial arts event held by Absolute Championship Berkut on June 22, 2014, at the Fight club Berkut in Grozny, Russia.

Results

ACB 10: Coliseum Time

Absolute Championship Berkut 10: Coliseum Time was a mixed martial arts event held by Absolute Championship Berkut on October 4, 2014 at the Fight club Berkut in Grozny, Russia.

Results

ACB 11: Vol. 1

Absolute Championship Berkut 11: Vol. 1 was a mixed martial arts event held by Absolute Championship Berkut on November 14, 2014 at the Fight club Berkut in Grozny, Russia.

Results

ACB 11: Vol. 2

Absolute Championship Berkut 11: Vol. 2 was a mixed martial arts event held by Absolute Championship Berkut on November 15, 2014 at the Fight club Berkut in Grozny, Russia.

Results

M-1 Challenge 54 / ACB 12

M-1 Challenge 54 / Absolute Championship Berkut 12 was a mixed martial arts event held by M-1 Global and Absolute Championship Berkut on December 17, 2014 at the Ice Palace in Saint Petersburg, Russia.

Results

References

Absolute Championship Akhmat
2014 in mixed martial arts
Absolute Championship Berkut events